Mustafa Haidi Makunganya Mkulo (born 26 September 1946) is a Tanzanian CCM politician and Member of Parliament for Kilosa constituency  2005–2015.

Graduate of the University of London with an MBA degree and he has been the Deputy Minister of Finance up until now

References

1946 births
Living people
Tanzanian accountants
Chama Cha Mapinduzi MPs
Tanzanian MPs 2005–2010
Tanzanian MPs 2010–2015
Finance Ministers of Tanzania
Pugu Secondary School alumni
Strathmore University alumni